The Wencheng dialect is a dialect of Wu Chinese. It is an Oujiang dialect, but its tone system differs from other Oujiang dialects such as Wenzhounese.

Phonology
The most important difference between eastern Oujiang dialects such as Wencheng and Wenzhou proper are tonal differences and the retention of  before :

Wencheng shares the long vowels of Wenzhonese entering tone (spelled puu above) as well as the abrupt glottal stops of the shang tones. The shang and ru tones are largely similar to Wenzhonese, but there are no falling tones—yang ping and yin qu are level—and yang qu is dipping rather than simply low.

Although yin qu has been said to have merged with yang ping (these are also close in Wenzhou, both being falling tones), the consonant voicing remains distinct. A second, slightly different transcription of Wencheng tone is reported, presumably largely due to speaker differences.

References

Wu Chinese